William Quintillian Dallmeyer (October 23, 1829 – March 15, 1908) was an American Missouri politician.

William Quintillian Dallmeyer was born in Hanover, Germany. He emigrated to the United States in 1845, living in New York City and New Orleans, Louisiana, before settling in St. Louis, Missouri, where he worked in the dry goods business. In 1856, he moved to Gasconade County, Missouri, where he divided his time between his farm, general store, and serving as the local postmaster and justice of the peace. In 1864, he was elected to the Missouri House of Representatives, serving until 1869, when he was elected State Treasurer. Following his two-year term as State Treasurer, he served as cashier at the First National Bank in Jefferson City, Missouri, from 1874 to 1882.

References 

1829 births
1908 deaths
State treasurers of Missouri
Republican Party members of the Missouri House of Representatives
Missouri postmasters
American justices of the peace
Hanoverian emigrants to the United States
People from Gasconade County, Missouri
Politicians from St. Louis
People from Jefferson City, Missouri
Politicians from New York City
Politicians from New Orleans
19th-century American politicians
19th-century American judges
Politicians from Hanover